Hiram Bingham II (August 16, 1831 – October 25, 1908) was a Protestant Christian missionary to Hawaii and the Gilbert Islands.

Life and career
Born in Honolulu, Bingham was the sixth child of early missionary Hiram Bingham I (1789–1869) and Sybil Moseley Bingham (1792–1848).  Both father and mother sailed from Boston, Massachusetts to Honolulu in 1819.  Only ten years old in 1840, Bingham was sent to the United States with his siblings Elizabeth Kaahumanu (1829–1899) and Lydia Bingham (1834–1915) to attend school.  Bingham was enrolled at Williston Seminary in Easthampton, Massachusetts and graduated from Yale University in 1853.

Bingham was ordained a Congregationalist minister in New Haven, Connecticut on November 9, 1856. Nine days later on November 18, Bingham married Clara Brewster in Northampton, Massachusetts.  The newlyweds arrived in Honolulu on April 24, 1857 where they both ministered to the native Hawaiians as part of American Board of Commissioners for Foreign Missions.  They eventually traveled and spread Christianity in several Pacific Ocean island communities, notably at the end of 1857 at the Gilbert Islands.

After a brief return to the United States in 1865, they arrived in Honolulu on March 13, 1867 for a stopover en route to the Marquesas Islands.  They went through Micronesia and returned to Honolulu again in 1868.  There they settled.  Bingham was the first to translate the Bible into Gilbertese, and wrote several hymn books, dictionaries and commentaries in the language of the Gilbert Islands.

From 1877 to 1880, Bingham served as Secretary of the Hawaiian Board and in 1895, Yale University awarded him the Doctorate of Divinity.  He died October 25, 1908 in Baltimore, Maryland.

Bingham's son, Hiram Bingham III, was an explorer who made public the existence of the Inca citadel of Machu Picchu in 1911 with the guidance of local indigenous farmers and later became a US Senator and (briefly) Governor of Connecticut.  His grandson, Hiram Bingham IV, was the US Vice Consul in Marseille, France, during World War II who rescued Jews from the Holocaust.  Another grandson, Jonathan Brewster Bingham, was a long-time Reform Democratic Congressman from The Bronx from the mid-1960s through the early 1980s.

References

Fathers and sons, the Bingham family and the American mission, by Char Miller, Published by Temple University Press, 1982, 

Protestantism in Hawaii
1831 births
1908 deaths
Williston Northampton School alumni
American Congregationalist missionaries
Christians from Hawaii
Christians from Maryland
Congregationalist missionaries in Hawaii
Death in Maryland
Congregationalist missionaries in Kiribati
Translators of the Bible into Gilbertese
People from Hawaii
American people of English descent
Yale Divinity School alumni
Yale College alumni
19th-century translators
Missionary linguists